This is a list of notable individuals born in Colombia of Lebanese ancestry or people of Lebanese and Colombian dual nationality who live or lived in Colombia.

Academia
Elías Bechara Zainúm - Cordoban philanthropist and chemist

Beauty pageant contestants
Laura González - Miss Colombia 2017
Gabriela Tafur - Miss Colombia 2019
Valerie Domínguez Tarud - Miss Colombia 2005
Paola Turbay - Miss Colombia 1991
Taliana Vargas - Miss Colombia 2008

Entertainment
 Carolina Guerra - actress, model, singer and presenter
 Majida Issa - actress
 Javier Jattin - professional Colombian actor
 John Leguizamo - American actor (maternal grandfather was Lebanese)
 Veronica Orozco - actress, singer and model

Journalism
 Leila Cobo - Music journalist for Billboard magazine
 Andrea Serna - RCN presenter and model
 Diana Turbay - journalist (daughter of Julio César Turbay Ayala)

Medicine
Salomón Hakim - neurosurgeon

Musicians
 Silvestre Dangond singer
 Naty Botero - singer
 Shakira - singer
 Soraya - singer

Politicians
 Julio César Turbay Ayala - former president of Colombia
 Alejandro Char - twice mayor of Barranquilla
 Arturo Char
 Jairo Clopatofsky - former senator
 José David Name - senator
 Claudia Turbay Quintero - diplomat and journalist
 José Name Terán - former senator
 Gabriel Turbay
 Francisco Jattin - former senator, and former representative to the chamber for Córdoba
 Zulema Jattin 
 Edwin Besaile - former governor of Córdoba

Sports
 Mauricio Hadad - former tennis player
 Robert Farah Maksoud - tennis player
 Faryd Mondragón - professional football player
 Fuad Reveiz - former American football player
 Alberto Rujana - professional football manager

Writers, literature, playwrights
Soad Louis Lakah

References

Colombia
Lebanese people

Lebanese